Tutufa bufo, common name the red-mouth frog shell, is a species of sea snail, a marine gastropod mollusk in the family Bursidae, the frog shells.

Description
The size of an adult shell varies between 50 mm and 240 mm.

Distribution
This marine species is distributed in the Indo-West Pacific.

References

 Cossignani (2009). Malacologia Mostra Mondiale 63 (2) : 27

External links
 

Bursidae
Gastropods described in 1798